Henry Weinhard's Private Reserve and Blitz-Weinhard were brands of beer first brewed in 1856 in Portland, Oregon. The brewery was owned by the brewer Henry Weinhard of the Weinhard family, who also made a line of soft drinks which survives to this day.

The Blitz-Weinhard brand was among several regional Pacific Northwest beers which were staples in that market during the decades following the repeal of Prohibition until they began losing market share to the national brands in the 1960s and 1970s.

Advertising campaign

Weinhard's created a unique and noteworthy advertising campaign in the late 1970s and 1980s to position its brand. The campaign featured a fictitious brand of beer called "Schludwiller" beer. A series of popular television commercials depicted Schludwiller as a beer brewed by the "California-Eastern Brewing Co." in California. In one of the ads, a "border patrolman" played by actor Dick Curtis asked Earl and Vern (the drivers of the Schludwiller Beer truck) "Well now…where you fellas going with all that beer?" Schludwiller came complete with its own motto in Latin: Quod Nesciunt Sibi Damno Non Erit (roughly: "What they don't know won't hurt them").

The Henry Weinhard's brand, repositioned as a quality microbrew, was able to regain and sustain its popularity. However, its favored status with beer-drinkers was not enough to save the original Portland brewery from eventual closure.

Like many businesses in the United States at the time, the Blitz-Weinhard brewery succumbed to purchase and resale by a number of companies in the late 20th century, including Pabst Brewing Company and Miller Brewing Company and now MillerCoors, the U.S. business unit of Molson Coors Brewing Company.  In August of 2021 Molson Coors announced the end of production for Henry Weinhard's Reserve.

Brewery

In 1862, Henry Weinhard moved to Portland, Oregon and purchased an old brewery on the corner of NW First and Davis, before moving in 1864 to a facility occupying two full blocks at NW 12th and Burnside. This Blitz-Weinhard brewery in Portland survived as a production facility under several ownership changes until 1999, when it was sold by the Stroh Brewery Company to the Miller Brewing Company, who closed it down in late August.  

The brewery was a fixture of an old industrial and warehouse district which, beginning in the 1990s, has become known as the Pearl District in downtown Portland, and its closure marked the beginning of a massive urban rejuvenation project. Following the closure of the Portland brewery in 1999, Henry Weinhard's was brewed at the Olympia brewery in Tumwater, Washington until that brewery too was closed in 2003. Some of its beers were brewed under contract at the Full Sail Brewing Company in Hood River until 2013.

The Henry Weinhard's Private Reserve brand survives today and is currently owned by Molson Coors Beverage Company.

Henry Weinhard's Private Reserve has been slated for discontinuation according to Molson as of August 2021.

Gourmet sodas
Molson Coors Beverage Company has sought to exploit the Henry Weinhard's brand selling gourmet sodas, distributed out of Colfax, California. Flavors include:
 Root Beer
 Vanilla cream soda
 Orange cream
 Black cherry cream

References

Further reading
 Boyce, Bert. "The Mash". Willamette Week, December 22, 1999.

External links

 
Molson Coors Beverage Company: Our Brands

Beer brewing companies based in Portland, Oregon
Companies based in Portland, Oregon
American companies established in 1856
1856 establishments in Oregon Territory
American beer brands
American soft drinks
Pabst Brewing Company
SABMiller
Food and drink companies established in 1856